Riccartsbar Hospital was a mental health facility in Paisley, Renfrewshire, Scotland.

History
The hospital, which was designed by John Honeyman, opened as the Paisley District Asylum in June 1876. The hospital went into a period of decline and, after patients had been transferred to Dykebar Hospital, Riccartsbar Hospital closed in 1975. The buildings were subsequently demolished to make way for the Royal Alexandra Hospital.

References

Hospital buildings completed in 1876
Hospitals established in 1876
1876 establishments in Scotland
1975 disestablishments in Scotland
Former psychiatric hospitals in Scotland
Defunct hospitals in Scotland
Hospitals in Renfrewshire
Buildings and structures in Paisley, Renfrewshire
Hospitals disestablished in 1975